HAT-P-4 is a wide binary star consisting of a pair of G-type main-sequence stars in the constellation of Boötes. It is also designated BD+36°2593.

The star exhibits an infrared excess noise of unknown origin.

Planetary System
The primary star is home to the transiting extrasolar planet HAT-P-4b. This planet is a fairly typical hot Jupiter type planet in a 3 day orbit.

Binary companion
The companion star is located at a distance of 28446 astronomical units and therefore has an orbital period that is extremely long.

See also
 HATNet Project

References

External links
 Image HAT-P-4
 

G-type main-sequence stars
Planetary transit variables
Planetary systems with one confirmed planet
Boötes
BD+36 2593
J15195792+3613467
Binary stars